Sai Ngam is a district (amphoe) in the eastern part of Kamphaeng Phet province, central Thailand.

Geography
Neighboring districts are (from the south clockwise) Sai Thong Watthana, Mueang Kamphaeng Phet, Phran Kratai, Lan Krabue of Kamphaeng Phet Province, Wachirabarami and Sam Ngam of Phichit province.

History
The minor district (king amphoe) Sai Ngam was created on 15 May 1975, when the two tambons Sai Ngam and Nong Khla were split off from Mueang Kamphaeng Phet district. It was upgraded to a full district on 25 March 1979.

Administration
The district is divided into seven sub-districts (tambons), which are further subdivided into 72 villages (mubans). Sai Ngam is a township (thesaban tambon) and covers parts of tambon Sai Ngam. There are a further seven tambon administrative organizations (TAO).

References

External links
amphoe.com

Sai Ngam